Gentlemen Prefer Blondes: The Intimate Diary of a Professional Lady (1925) is a comic novel written by American author Anita Loos. The story follows the dalliances of a young blonde gold-digger named Lorelei Lee "in the bathtub-gin era of American history." Published the same year as F. Scott Fitzgerald's The Great Gatsby and Carl Van Vechten's Firecrackers, the work is one of several famous 1925 American novels which focus upon the insouciant hedonism of the Jazz Age.

Originally serialized as a series of short sketches in Harper's Bazaar magazine during the spring and summer of 1925, Loos' sketches were republished in book form by Boni & Liveright in November 1925. Although dismissed by literary critics as "too light in texture to be very enduring," the book garnered the praise of many writers including F. Scott Fitzgerald, James Joyce, William Faulkner, and H. G. Wells. Edith Wharton hailed Loos' satirical work as "the great American novel" as the character of Lorelei Lee embodied the avarice and self-indulgence that characterized 1920s America during the presidencies of Warren G. Harding and Calvin Coolidge.

Loos' lighthearted book became the second-best selling title of 1926 in the United States and a runaway international bestseller. It was printed throughout the world in over thirteen different languages, including Russian and Chinese. By the time Loos died of a heart attack in 1981 at the age of 93, the work had been printed in over 85 editions and adapted into a 1926 comic strip, a 1926 silent comedy, a 1949 Broadway musical, and a 1953 film adaptation of the latter musical. 

Loos wrote a sequel, But Gentlemen Marry Brunettes, in 1927. Decades later, Loos was asked during a television interview whether she intended to write a third book. She facetiously replied that the title and theme of a third book would be Gentlemen Prefer Gentlemen. This quip resulted in the interview's termination.

Background 

While working as a film screenwriter in Hollywood, California, the forty-year-old Anita Loos was inspired to write Gentlemen Prefer Blondes by an incident aboard a train in early 1925. "I was allowed to lug heavy suitcases from their racks while men sat about and failed to note my efforts," she recalled, and yet, when a young woman—purportedly fourteen-year-old Mae Clarke—"happened to drop the novel she was reading, several men jumped to retrieve it." As an attractive woman herself, Loos assumed this striking contrast in the men's behavior was because she was a brunette and the other woman was a blonde. 

Biographer Gary Carey notes that Loos told differing versions of this origin story: "Over the years, [Loos] gave several accounts of its genesis, each differing as to specific detail, though the gist was always the same. In one version, she is traveling by herself; in a second, she runs into Douglas Fairbanks and a party of friends. Alone or with Doug, she meets a blond cutie who is either the lady friend of a Supreme Court justice or one of [H. L.] Mencken's playmates. If she belongs to Mencken, as she does in most accounts, her name is either Mae Davis or Mae Clarke, always identified as an actress."

Regardless of the differing origin stories, all of them involve Loos aboard a train writing a short story in the persona of a young blonde flapper in which she recounts her dalliances in an intimate diary. When drafting the story, Loos drew upon memories of jealously observing Ziegfeld Follies showgirls turn gruff littérateur and magazine editor H. L. Mencken into a love-struck simpleton. "Prompted by a flirtation that Henry Mencken was having with a stupid little blonde," Loos later explained, "I wrote a skit poking fun at his romance. I had no thought of it ever being printed; my only purpose was to make Henry laugh at himself." 

Upon arriving at her home, Loos forgot about the story. She later rediscovered the manuscript when unpacking her suitcase. Deciding that Mencken might enjoy it, she placed the manuscript in an envelope and mailed it to him. Mencken, a close friend to whom Loos was sexually attracted, enjoyed the deprecatory piece and forwarded the manuscript to Henry Sell, the editor of Harper's Bazaar. Sell accepted the story for publication, and he urged Loos to continue writing about the blonde flapper's escapades. Due to the popularity of Loos' stories, the magazine's circulation skyrocketed, and Boni & Liveright published the stories in book form in November 1925.

Plot summary 

Born in Arkansas, a blonde flapper named Lorelei Lee meets Gus Eisman, a Chicago businessman whom she calls "Daddy." He installs her in a New York City apartment and spends a small fortune "educating" her. He pays for jewelry from Cartier, dinners at the Ritz, and tickets to the Ziegfeld Follies. During this time, she meets a married novelist named Gerry Lamson, who frowns upon her liaison with Eisman. Lamson wishes to "save" her from Eisman and asks her to marry him. Not wishing to forgo an upcoming trip to Europe paid for by Eisman, Lorelei spurns Lamson. Meanwhile, she is dismayed that her friend Dorothy Shaw wastes her time with a poor editor named Mencken, who writes for a dull magazine, when she could be spending time with wealthier men.

Lorelei and Dorothy sail for Europe on the RMS Majestic. Lorelei learns that Bartlett, a former district attorney who is now a U.S. Senator, is aboard the ship. She tells a sympathetic Englishman about how she met Bartlett. She recounts a dubious backstory in which a lawyer employed her as a stenographer, and she shot him to defend her virtue. During the trial, which Bartlett prosecuted, Lorelei gave such "compelling" testimony that the all-male jury acquitted her. The skeptical judge bought her a ticket to Hollywood so that she could use her acting talents to become a star. Due to her siren-like personality, the judge nicknamed her "Lorelei". Conspiring with the Englishman, Lorelei exacts revenge on Bartlett by seducing him and revealing private information about his senatorial activities.

Dorothy and Lorelei arrive in England where they are unimpressed with the Tower of London as it is smaller than "the Hickox building in Little Rock." They are invited to a soirée where English aristocrats are selling counterfeit jewels to naive tourists. Lorelei encounters an elderly matron who is selling a diamond tiara. Lorelei casts her eye around the room for a wealthy man to buy it for her and settles on Sir Francis Beekman, whom she calls "Piggie." With flattery and the promise of discretion due to his matrimonial status, she persuades him to buy the tiara.

In Paris, the duo are more excited by jewelry shops than by the "Eyeful Tower." Beekman's wife confronts Lorelei and threatens to ruin her reputation if she does not return the tiara. Dorothy intercedes on Lorelei's behalf and notes that Lady Beekman's threats are hollow since Lorelei has no reputation to destroy. 

Later, the flappers are confronted by a French lawyer and his son acting on behalf of Lady Beekman. Impressed by the women's beauty, the father and son dine with them and charge all expenses to Lady Beekman. Lorelei has a replica made of the tiara and—by playing the father and son against each other—she keeps the real tiara and sends them away with the fake one.

Eisman arrives in Paris and, after shopping trips with Lorelei, he departs for Vienna. He puts Lorelei and Dorothy on the Orient Express where she encounters Henry Spoffard, a staunch Presbyterian, prohibitionist, and moral reformer who delights in censoring movies. To gain his trust, Lorelei pretends that she is a reformer too and claims that she is trying to save Dorothy from her sinful lifestyle. At this point, Lorelei is two-timing both Eisman and Spoffard.

In Vienna, Spoffard insists Lorelei meet a "Dr. Froyd." Freud fails to psycho-analyze her because she has never repressed her inhibitions. Later, Lorelei tells her past history to Spoffard in a sympathetic light. He weeps at the moral outrages which Lorelei has supposedly endured and likens her to Mary Magdalene. Meeting his mother, Lorelei claims to be a Christian Scientist and that drinking champagne is encouraged by her religion. They become drunk together, and his mother decides that Christian Science is a more preferable religion than Presbyterianism. Lorelei gives her a cloche hat but, since Spoffard's mother has an Edwardian hairstyle, Lorelei bobs her hair for the hat to fit. Soon after, Spoffard proposes marriage to Lorelei by letter. Lorelei plots to use this letter as future evidence of breach of promise and thus obtain a financial settlement from Spoffard's family.

Tiring of Spoffard, Lorelei nudges him towards breach of promise by embarking upon a shopping spree and charging it all to his accounts. Meanwhile, she meets Gilbertson Montrose, a handsome screenwriter. Montrose advises her that it would be wiser to marry Spoffard so that he could finance Montrose's new movie in which Lorelei could star. Lorelei decides she will marry Spoffard while pursuing a clandestine sexual liaison with Montrose. She rushes to Penn Station and finds Spoffard. She claims her extravagance was faked to test his love. Remorseful, Spoffard vows to marry her and to finance Montrose's film.

Major characters 

 Lorelei Lee—a young blonde flapper from Arkansas. As a relentless gold digger, Lorelei epitomizes the insouciant hedonism and unbridled avarice of the Jazz Age. The character was partly inspired by actresses Peggy Hopkins Joyce and Lillian Lorraine. As the most notorious of Florenz Ziegfeld's showgirls, Lorraine "was fond of all things sterling, forty-carat or unflawed, and she collected so many trinkets that when forced to sell the lot at the height of the [Great] Depression, she pocketed over two hundred thousand dollars."
 Dorothy Shaw—Lorelei's world-weary and perceptive brunette companion based upon Loos herself as well as her friend Constance Talmadge.
 Henry Spoffard—a staunch Presbyterian reformer and film censor based upon teetotaling and moralizing Hollywood film czar Will H. Hays.
 Sir Francis Beekman—a toothless flirt nicknamed "Piggie" who gives a diamond tiara to Lorelei in exchange for her physical affections. The character was modeled upon both writer Joseph Hergesheimer and producer Jesse L. Lasky who pestered Loos and other attractive young women at Hollywood soirées.
 Lady Beekman—the wife of Sir Francis Beekman who stalks Lorelei and Dorothy to France in order to obtain the tiara which her husband gifted to the blonde flapper.
 Gus Eisman—a wealthy international businessman known as "the Button King of Chicago" who serves as Lorelei's sugar daddy until she later weds Henry Spoffard. The character bears a resemblance to globe-trotting entrepreneur and con-artist Ivar Kreuger who was popularly known as "the Match King" during the Twenties.
 Edward Goldmark—a film producer based upon Polish-American impresario Samuel Goldwyn who cultivated young blonde actresses such as Anna Sten.
 Gilbertson Montrose—a handsome young Hollywood screenwriter with whom Lorelei plans to have an extramarital affair after her marriage to Spoffard. The character was likely modeled upon Anita Loos' husband, playwright John Emerson.

Critical reception 

Gentlemen Prefer Blondes: The Intimate Diary of a Professional Lady became an instant success the moment it hit bookstores in November 1925 and sold out all copies on the day it was released. A second edition of sixty thousand copies likewise sold out within the next thirty days. Afterward, the novel sold on average 1,000 copies per day. Loos' work became the second-best selling title of 1926 in the United States, and her work outsold F. Scott Fitzgerald's The Great Gatsby, Theodore Dreiser's An American Tragedy, Ernest Hemingway's In Our Time, Ezra Pound's The Cantos, and William Faulkner's Soldier's Pay. 

Although the book sold phenomenally, the critical response was mixed. Whereas some reviewers described the work as "droll and merry," "side-splittingly funny," and "sly and sophisticated," other reviewers were less enthusiastic and patently unamused. Ruth Goodman in The New York Tribune disliked Loos' misspelling words for comedic effect. Columnist Doris Blake in The New York Daily News criticized Loos for asserting that blondes are more sexually appealing to men than brunettes. Perhaps the most laudatory review was by Herman J. Mankiewicz—the future screenwriter of Citizen Kane—who gave Loos' book a rave review in The New York Times and summarized the novel as "a gorgeously smart and intelligent piece of work."

Despite the mixed critical reviews, other authors heaped copious praise upon the work. Author William Faulkner wrote a personal letter to Loos after reading her novel. Filled with congratulatory remarks, Faulkner lauded the brilliance of Gentlemen Prefer Blondes and complimented Loos regarding the originality of her characters such as Dorothy Shaw. Aldous Huxley, author of the dystopian novel Brave New World, likewise wrote a letter of praise to Loos. As a result of this letter, Huxley and Loos later met in 1926 when the British novelist visited America for the first time.

Among the list of names of other great authors from the time period, F. Scott Fitzgerald, E. B. White, Sherwood Anderson, William Empson, Rose Macauley, Arnold Bennett, H. G. Wells, James Joyce, and Edith Wharton all praised Loos' novel. Wharton declared Gentlemen Prefer Blondes as "the great American novel," ostensibly because the character of Lorelei Lee embodied the avarice, frivolity, and immoderation that characterized 1920s America during Warren G. Harding and Calvin Coolidge years. James Joyce stated that—even though his eyesight was failing him—he "reclined on a sofa reading Gentlemen Prefer Blondes for three days" while taking a break from writing Finnegans Wake.

George Santayana, the Spanish-American philosopher and author, facetiously averred that Gentlemen Prefer Blondes was "the best book on philosophy written by an American." Arnold Bennett and H. G. Wells later escorted Loos out to dinner when she visited London as a reward for her excellent work. Even the Prince of Wales was reported to have been so amused by the novel that he purchased many copies of the book and gave them to his companions.

The work's popularity crossed national borders into countries such as the Republic of China and the Soviet Union, and the book was translated into more than a dozen different languages and published in 85 editions. In 1927, Loos wrote a well-received sequel, But Gentlemen Marry Brunettes. Several decades later, Loos was asked during a television interview in London whether she intended to write a third book. She facetiously replied that the title and theme of a third book would be Gentlemen Prefer Gentlemen. This remark resulted in the interview's abrupt termination.

Critical analysis 
Critics in socialist countries interpreted the work to be an anti-capitalist polemic. "When the book reached Russia," Loos recalled, "it was embraced by Soviet authorities as evidence of the exploitation of helpless female blondes by predatory magnates of the capitalistic system. The Russians, with their native love of grief, stripped Gentlemen Prefer Blondes of all its fun and the plot which they uncovered was dire." 

These anti-capitalist reviews focused upon "the early rape of its heroine, an attempt by her to commit murder, the heroine being cast adrift in the gangster-infested New York of Prohibition days, her relentless pursuit by predatory males, her renunciation of the only man who ever stirred her inner soul as a woman, her nauseous connection with a male who is repulsive to her physically, mentally and emotionally and her final engulfment in the grim monotony of suburban Philadelphia." Loos denied any such political intentions in the work and was amused by such dour interpretations.

Adaptations 

Following the widespread success of the book, Loos was contacted by Broadway impresario Florenz Ziegfeld who suggested to Loos that he adapt the story as a glamorous and sophisticated musical. Ziegfeld said that actress Marilyn Miller—one of the most popular Broadway musical stars of the 1920s—should play the siren role of Lorelei Lee. To her regret, Loos had already signed a contract with rival Broadway producer Edgar Selwyn to adapt the story as a straight comedy, and she could not break the contract.

Under the contract with Selwyn, Loos and her playwright husband John Emerson adapted the novel as a Broadway stage play. Brunette June Walker was cast as Lorelei and performed the role in a blonde wig. Comedienne Edna Hibbard played Dorothy and Frank Morgan portrayed reformer Henry Spoffard. The play debuted in Detroit and was performed 201 times from 1926 to 1927. As the first actress to portray Lorelei Lee, June Walker was instrumental in an interpretation that helped define the character. She was said to have "played a role that was as much her creation as that of Anita Loos." "Tossing her golden curls, blinking her eyes and twirling her waist-length string of pearls," Walker's version of Lorelei embodied the flapper of the Roaring Twenties. The success of the play launched Walker's career, and she had further Broadway successes.

After the play's triumphant success, Loos licensed her novel for use in a daily newspaper comic strip series that ran from April 1926 to September 1926. The comic strip was not an adaptation of the novel but placed its characters in new comedic situations. Although the writing was credited to Loos, it was presumably ghost-written by the artists, Virginia Huget and Phil Cook. This original 1926 series was reprinted in newspapers from 1929 to the early 1930s.

A year later, the book was adapted as a silent 1928 Paramount motion picture. Under that contract, Loos and her husband Emerson wrote the screenplay and had "to prepare the final scenario, select the cast, and have a hand in supervising the production," as well as write the inter-titles. The film was directed by Malcolm St. Clair, and Lorelei Lee was played by Ruth Taylor. Loos hand-picked her for the role because she bore "a remarkable resemblance to Ralph Barton's illustrations in the book." Loos later described Taylor's performance as "so ideal for the role that she even played it off-screen and married a wealthy broker." Following the film's success, Taylor married a prominent New York City businessman and became a Park Avenue socialite. For the 1928 film, Loos altered the story to include a prologue featuring Lorelei's grandfather as a gold-obsessed prospector and an epilogue in which Lorelei's impoverished Arkansas family learn via radio of her lavish wedding.

By 1929, Loos' gold-digger epic had been adapted for a variety of different mediums: "It had been done in book form and serialized in magazines and syndicated in newspapers and designed into dress material and printed into wall paper and made into a comic strip and had even had a song by Irving Berlin."

Over a decade later in 1941, theater director John C. Wilson suggested that Loos permit a musical adaptation of the story. Wilson's desired version never came to fruition. The musical adaptation was produced by Herman Levin and Oliver Smith, whom Loos met while sailing on a steamship to the United States from Europe. The 1949 musical edition starred Carol Channing as Lorelei Lee and Yvonne Adair as Dorothy Shaw, and ran for 740 performances on Broadway. The musical's success prompted a brief sartorial revival of 1920s fashions by dress factories.

The second and more popular film adaptation of the novel was derived from the 1949 musical and released in 1953 by 20th Century Fox. This second adaptation was filmed in technicolor and featured Marilyn Monroe as Lorelei and Jane Russell as Dorothy. In order to conform to the moral precepts of the Motion Picture Production Code, much of the sexual promiscuity of the 1949 musical was expurgated in the 1953 film adaptation as film censors in the 1950s United States deemed any authentic cinematic interpretation of the bygone Jazz Age—with its libertine sexuality and bra-less flappers—to be impermissible.

See also 
 Gentlemen Prefer Blondes (1928 film)
 Gentlemen Prefer Blondes (musical)
 Gentlemen Prefer Blondes (1953 film)

References

Notes

Citations

Bibliography

External links 

 
 
 
 
 
 

Fiction set in 1925
1925 American novels
Adultery in novels
American comedy novels
American satirical novels
American novels adapted into films
American novels adapted into plays
Fictional diaries
Novels by Anita Loos
Novels first published in serial form
Novels set in the Roaring Twenties
Novels set in New York City
Novels set in Paris
Blond hair
Works originally published in Harper's Bazaar
Boni & Liveright books
Flappers